Zhang Liao Family Temple is an ancestral shrine located in East District, Taichung City, Taiwan. Built in 1904, the shrine is protected as a city monument.

History 
The Zhang Liao family originated in current-day Guanbei, Fujian Province. The unique surname is a merger of the Zhang and Liao families when the Liao's only female successor married into the Zhang family. At the time, the families came to an agreement; future descendants of this clan would use the Liao surname when alive, but would belong to the Zhang family when dead.

In the early Qing Dynasty, the Zhang Liao family moved to current day Xitun District and Daya District. In 1886, Zhang Liao members began preparing to build a family shrine. Construction of the main building lasted between 1909 and 1911, and the surrounding buildings were completed in 1916.

On November 27, 1985, the Taichung City Government protected the building as a city monument. The building was renovated by the government in 1994 and is planning on renovating it again in 2020.

Gallery

See also 
 Chinese ancestral veneration
 List of temples in Taichung
 List of temples in Taiwan
 Zhang Family Temple
 Lin Family Ancestral Shrine

References 

1911 establishments in Taiwan
Religious buildings and structures completed in 1911
Temples in Taichung
Ancestral shrines in Taiwan